Güler is a Turkish name and may refer to:

Given name
 Güler İleri (born 1948), Turkish pharmacist, politician and former government minister
 Güler Sabancı (born 1955), Turkish businesswoman

Surname
 Ara Güler, photographer and photojournalist.
 Aydemir Güler (born 1961), Turkish communist politician
 Esra Güler (born 1994), Turkish women's footballer
 Hilmi Güler (born 1946), Turkish politician and metallurgical engineer
 Muammer Güler (born 1949), Turkish politician
 Muratcan Güler (born 1980), Turkish professional basketball player
 Sibel Güler (born 1984), Bulgarian-born Turkish female taekwondo practitioner
 Sinan Güler (born 1983), Turkish professional basketball player
 Yasemin Güler (born 1994), Turkish female handball player
 Özgüç Güler (born 1985) Turkish Rapper and winner of RapStar

Turkish-language surnames
Turkish feminine given names